Progress was an express train between Prague, then the capital of Czechoslovakia, and the German Democratic Republic (GDR).

Introduced in 1974, Progress  went through a number of iterations, and also endured a one-year period off the rails, until it ceased running altogether in about 1990.

History
Progress first ran in 1974.  Initially, it was categorised as a Schnellzug, D76/77, and ran between Praha-Holešovice in Prague and Berlin-Lichtenberg in East Berlin, GDR.

In 1986, Progress was recategorised as one of the new top-of-the-line Interexpress services, and renumbered as IEx 78/79.  Its route remained as before.

Progress ran as an Interexpress only until 1988, when it disappeared from the timetable.

The following year, Progress was revived, and its route extended further north, from East Berlin to Rostock Hauptbahnhof in Rostock, GDR.  However, it was soon discontinued once again.

See also

 History of rail transport in the Czech Republic
 History of rail transport in Germany
 List of named passenger trains of Europe

References

External links
 Private web page – about the history of the DR's international trains 1977 to 1993 
 Private web page – about the history of the IEx trains 

International named passenger trains
Named passenger trains of Germany
Named passenger trains of the Czech Republic
Railway services introduced in 1974